The Thomson Orioles were a minor league baseball team based in Thomson, Georgia in 1956. Thomson qualified for the playoffs and played the season as members of the Class D level Georgia State League, which permanently folded following the completion of the 1956 season. The Orioles hosted home minor league games at The Brickyard. The Thomson Orioles were a minor league affiliate of the Baltimore Orioles.

History
In 1920, Thomson, Georgia fielded a team in the semi–professional North Georgia League. Thomson was in 1st place in the league with a 20–5 record in standings posted on July 15, 1920. Thomson won the first half pennant in the league and played Elberton, winners of the second half pennant, in the finals.

Thomson first hosted minor league baseball in 1956, as the Thomson "Orioles" began play.  The newly formed Thomson franchise became members of the six–team the Class D level Georgia State League, in the league's final season of play. The Thomson Orioles were a minor league affiliate of the Baltimore Orioles. The Thomson Orioles joined the Douglas Reds, Dublin Irish, Hazlehurst-Baxley Tigers, Sandersville Giants and Vidalia Indians in Georgia State League play. Thompson replaced the Statesboro Pilots franchise, who had folded from the league in 1955.

The Thomson Orioles placed 4th in the 1956 Georgia State League final standings and qualified for the playoffs. Thomson ended the Georgia State League regular season with a 61–59 record, playing under managers Enid Drake and Barney Lutz, finishing 16.0 games behind the 1st place Douglas Reds in the final standings. In the 1956 playoffs, the Sandersville Giants defeated Thomson 3 games to 2 in the first–round series. The Georgia State League permanently folded after completing the 1956 season.

Attendance issues were a contributing factor in the Georgia State League folding following the 1956 season. The Thomson Orioles season home attendance at The Brickyard was 40,849, an average of 681 per game, leading the Georgia State League in attendance. Thomson drew 8,000 more fans than the 2nd ranked team in home attendance.

Thomson, Georgia has not hosted another minor league team.

The ballpark
The Thomson Orioles team played minor league home games at The Brickyard. Reportedly, the facility was built with remaining brick from the Thomson High School building, which was struck by lightning and destroyed in 1937. Today, the facility is still in use as home to Thomson High School athletic teams.  The original baseball grandstands have been removed. The Brickyard stadium is located at 612 Main Street Thomson, Georgia.

Year–by–year records

Notable alumni
 Lloyd Brown (1956)
 Fred Hofmann (1956)
 Roger Marquis (1956)

See also
Thomson Orioles players

References

External links
Thompson - Baseball Reference

Baseball teams established in 1956
Baseball teams disestablished in 1956
Defunct Georgia State League teams
Professional baseball teams in Georgia (U.S. state)
Baltimore Orioles minor league affiliates
1955 establishments in Georgia (U.S. state)
1956 disestablishments in Georgia (U.S. state)
Defunct minor league baseball teams
Defunct baseball teams in Georgia
McDuffie County, Georgia